The Swan Inn (formerly thought to have been called the Saracen's Head) is a Grade II listed pub dating back several centuries. It is located in the City of Westminster at 66 Bayswater Road, London W2. Today a popular tourist haunt at the edge of Hyde Park, run by Fuller's Brewery, it was in former times a resting point for stage coaches proceeding toward London.

The highwayman Claude Duval is reputed to have stopped here for his last drink on the way to his hanging at Tyburn in 1670.

Sources
Article in British History Online

References

External links
 Official website

Grade II listed pubs in the City of Westminster
Bayswater
Fuller's pubs